

The Torra di a Parata is a ruined Genoese tower located in the commune of Ajaccio, Corse-du-Sud, on the west coast of the island of Corsica, France.

The tower was built in 1550–1551 by  Giacomo Lombardo. It was one of a series of coastal defences constructed by the Republic of Genoa between 1530 and 1620 to stem the attacks by Barbary pirates. It contains two vaulted rooms, one above the other.

In Genoese documents the tower is called the Sanguinera di Terra. A similar tower which once sat on the highest point of the Grande Sanguinaire island was called the Sanguinera di Fuori or the Sanguinera di Mare. The Grande Sanguinaire tower was demolished in the 19th century when the existing lighthouse was constructed. A second small tower at the south-west end of the Grande Sanguinaire island has survived. In a Genoese document it is referred to as the torretta piccola (little tower). It is now called the Torra di Castelluchju.

Gallery

See also
List of Genoese towers in Corsica

References

Sources

External links
 Includes information on how to reach 90 towers and many photographs.

Towers in Corsica
Torre di a Parata
Buildings and structures in Corse-du-Sud
Tourist attractions in Corse-du-Sud